R. Rajalakshmi may refer to:
R. Rajalakshmi (politician), Indian politician
R. Rajalakshmi (scientist) (1926–2007), Indian biochemist and nutritionist